Abdrashitovo (Äbdräşit) is a rural locality (a village) in Mesyagutovsky Selsoviet of Duvansky District, Bashkortostan, Russia. The population was 402 as of 2010. There are 4 streets.

Geography 
Abdrashitovo is located 10 km northeast of Mesyagutovo (the district's administrative centre) by road. Karanayevo is the nearest rural locality.

References 

Rural localities in Duvansky District